Pasir Gudang Highway, also known as Federal Route 17, is a highway in Johor Bahru District, Johor, Malaysia that connects Tampoi North in the west to Pasir Gudang and Tanjung Langsat in the east. Pasir Gudang Highway is a four-laned highway, unlike the wider Skudai Highway which has six lanes. Many cargo trucks travel along the highway daily. Pasir Gudang Highway became the backbone of the road system linking Johor Bahru to Pasir Gudang before being surpassed by the Senai–Desaru Expressway, SDE 22, and the Johor Bahru East Coast Parkway 35.

Route background
The Kilometre Zero of the Pasir Gudang Highway is located at Tampoi, Johor, at its interchange with the Skudai Highway (Federal Route 1), the main trunk road of the central of Peninsular Malaysia.

History
With the opening of the Johor Port on 1977. The new highway from Johor Bahru to Pasir Gudang was constructed. Construction of the highway began in 1977 and was completed in 1979.

Features
 Four lane carriageway
 Narrow and no emergency lanes
 Some accident hot spots along the highway
 Flood prone area

At most sections, the Federal Route 17 was built under the JKR R5 road standard, allowing maximum speed limit of up to 90 km/h.

There are no overlaps, alternate routes, or sections with motorcycle lanes.

On 10 March 2012, the Malaysian Prime Minister, Najib Tun Razak announced that the 15 km stretch from Tebrau to Seri Alam of the 32 km-long Pasir Gudang Highway would be upgraded from four-lane to six-lane carriageway.

List of interchanges and junctions

Persisiran Perling

Pasir Gudang Highway

Tanjung Langsat Highway

References

Expressways and highways in Johor
017